This is a list of episodes of In Bed with Medinner episodes in broadcast order, from broadcast series 3.

Programme one 
 Production code: 9C25409
 First aired: 1997-01-11
 Running time: 24:42

Summary 
Part 1: titles, intro, clips: paramedics, sketch casualty man, EOP
Part 2: Bop, clips: Paramedics, flatmates, credits, sketch, logo.

Credits 
Host - Bob Mills
Director - Tony Gregory
Producers - Jeff Pope, Beverley Taylor
Production Assts. - Amanda Church, S Scott
Researchers - Dan Clapton, Conrad Green, Tim Quicke
Film Researcher - Nick Ray
Production Manager - Jackie Penn
Vision Controller - Luke Chantrell
On-Line Editors - Danny Davies, Malcolm Dunnett, Mark Goodwin, Alex Maddison
Sound Supervisor - Charles Fearnley
Lighting Director - Warwick Fielding
Lighting Camera Persons - Ian Goff, Alun Knott
Floor Manager - Ken Hounsom
Designer - Margaret Howat
Vision Mixer - Alison Jones
Camera Person - Mike Patterson

Programme two 
 Production code: 9C25414
 First aired: 1997-01-18
 Running time: 24:10

Summary 
Part 1:Titles, Bob's intro, clips: Natwest Tower (reporters Anna Marie Ash, Lindsay Charlton, Alistair Stewart; features Michael Heseltine). Docklands Wildlife (Alistair Stewart & Vince Rogers), 'Police Ops'.
Part 2: Health Prog (Colin Welland & Maggie Makepeace), crd, sketch, logo.

Credits 
Host - Bob Mills
Director - Tony Gregory
Producers - Jeff Pope, Beverley Taylor
Production Assts. - Amanda Church, S Scott
Researchers - Dan Clapton, Conrad Green, Tim Quicke
Film Researcher - Nick Ray
Production Manager - Jackie Penn
Vision Controller - Luke Chantrell
On-Line Editors - Danny Davies, Malcolm Dunnett, Mark Goodwin, Alex Maddison
Sound Supervisor - Charles Fearnley
Lighting Director - Warwick Fielding
Lighting Camera Persons - Ian Goff, Alun Knott
Floor Manager - Ken Hounsom
Designer - Margaret Howat
Vision Mixer - Alison Jones
Camera Person - Mike Patterson

Programme three 
 Production code: 9C25407
 First aired: 1997-02-01
 Running time: 24:19

Summary 
Part 1: Pre-titles sketch, titles, intro, clips: teacher, Sumo Wrestlers, EOP.
PArt 2: Bop, Casualty Man sketch, Sumo wrestlers, credits, sketch, logo.

Credits 
Host - Bob Mills
Director - Tony Gregory
Producers - Jeff Pope, Beverley Taylor
Production Assts. - Amanda Church, S Scott
Researchers - Dan Clapton, Conrad Green, Tim Quicke
Film Researcher - Nick Ray
Production Manager - Jackie Penn
Vision Controller - Luke Chantrell
On-Line Editors - Danny Davies, Malcolm Dunnett, Mark Goodwin, Alex Maddison
Sound Supervisor - Charles Fearnley
Lighting Director - Warwick Fielding
Lighting Camera Persons - Ian Goff, Alun Knott
Floor Manager - Ken Hounsom
Designer - Margaret Howat
Vision Mixer - Alison Jones
Camera Person - Mike Patterson

Programme four 
 Production code: 9C25412
 First aired: 1997-02-22
 Running time: 24:32

Summary 
Part 1:Titles, intro, clips: ghost files (with Billy Roberts), EOP.
Part 2: Bop, casualty man sketch, clips: teenage gangs, credits, sketch, logo

Credits 
Host - Bob Mills
Director - Tony Gregory
Producers - Jeff Pope, Beverley Taylor
Production Assts. - Amanda Church, S Scott
Researchers - Dan Clapton, Conrad Green, Tim Quicke
Film Researcher - Nick Ray
Production Manager - Jackie Penn
Vision Controller - Luke Chantrell
On-Line Editors - Danny Davies, Malcolm Dunnett, Mark Goodwin, Alex Maddison
Sound Supervisor - Charles Fearnley
Lighting Director - Warwick Fielding
Lighting Camera Persons - Ian Goff, Alun Knott
Floor Manager - Ken Hounsom
Designer - Margaret Howat
Vision Mixer - Alison Jones
Camera Person - Mike Patterson

Programme five 
 Production code: 9C25413
 First aired: 1997-03-15
 Running time: 24:18

Summary 
Part 1: titles, intro, clips: Crime Monthly (presenter Penny Smith) Heavy Metal Doc. (Narr. Danny Baker), EOP.
Part 2: Bop, clips: knife fighting (Kelly Warden), credits, Anthea Turner on stalkers, and logo.

Credits 
Host - Bob Mills
Director - Tony Gregory
Producers - Jeff Pope, Beverley Taylor
Production Assts. - Amanda Church, S Scott
Researchers - Dan Clapton, Conrad Green, Tim Quicke
Film Researcher - Nick Ray
Production Manager - Jackie Penn
Vision Controller - Luke Chantrell
On-Line Editors - Danny Davies, Malcolm Dunnett, Mark Goodwin, Alex Maddison
Sound Supervisor - Charles Fearnley
Lighting Director - Warwick Fielding
Lighting Camera Persons - Ian Goff, Alun Knott
Floor Manager - Ken Hounsom
Designer - Margaret Howat
Vision Mixer - Alison Jones
Camera Person - Mike Patterson

Programme six 
 Production code: 9C25408
 First aired: 1997-03-22
 Running time: 24:45

Summary 
Full of third-party footage

Credits 
Host - Bob Mills
Director - Tony Gregory
Producers - Jeff Pope, Beverley Taylor
Production Assts. - Amanda Church, S Scott
Researchers - Dan Clapton, Conrad Green, Tim Quicke
Film Researcher - Nick Ray
Production Manager - Jackie Penn
Vision Controller - Luke Chantrell
On-Line Editors - Danny Davies, Malcolm Dunnett, Mark Goodwin, Alex Maddison
Sound Supervisor - Charles Fearnley
Lighting Director - Warwick Fielding
Lighting Camera Persons - Ian Goff, Alun Knott
Floor Manager - Ken Hounsom
Designer - Margaret Howat
Vision Mixer - Alison Jones
Camera Person - Mike Patterson

Programme seven 
 Production code: 9C25405
 First aired: 1997-03-29
 Running time: 24:25

Summary 
Part 1: Titles; intro; clips; interview with Tony Fisk; Doucing and the Dodo (Energy expert Gillian Lee); Car sketch; EOP.
Part 2: Bop clips; mans seeks woman; sketch; credits;, sketch; end logo.

Credits 
Host - Bob Mills
Director - Tony Gregory
Producers - Jeff Pope, Beverley Taylor
Production Assts. - Amanda Church, S Scott
Researchers - Dan Clapton, Conrad Green, Tim Quicke
Film Researcher - Nick Ray
Production Manager - Jackie Penn
Vision Controller - Luke Chantrell
On-Line Editors - Danny Davies, Malcolm Dunnett, Mark Goodwin, Alex Maddison
Sound Supervisor - Charles Fearnley
Lighting Director - Warwick Fielding
Lighting Camera Persons - Ian Goff, Alun Knott
Floor Manager - Ken Hounsom
Designer - Margaret Howat
Vision Mixer - Alison Jones
Camera Person - Mike Patterson

Programme eight 
 Production code: 9C25410
 First aired: 1997-04-05
 Running time: 24:06

Summary 
Part 1: Titles, intro, clips: Essex FM (Peter Holmes, Robbie Dee and Unnamed female DJ) sketch EOP.
Part 2: Bop, sketch, clips: special force, credits, sketch, end logo.

Credits 
Host - Bob Mills
Director - Tony Gregory
Producers - Jeff Pope, Beverley Taylor
Production Assts. - Amanda Church, S Scott
Researchers - Dan Clapton, Conrad Green, Tim Quicke
Film Researcher - Nick Ray
Production Manager - Jackie Penn
Vision Controller - Luke Chantrell
On-Line Editors - Danny Davies, Malcolm Dunnett, Mark Goodwin, Alex Maddison
Sound Supervisor - Charles Fearnley
Lighting Director - Warwick Fielding
Lighting Camera Persons - Ian Goff, Alun Knott
Floor Manager - Ken Hounsom
Designer - Margaret Howat
Vision Mixer - Alison Jones
Camera Person - Mike Patterson

Programme nine 
 Production code: 9C25411
 First aired: 1997-04-12
 Running time: 24:46

Summary 
Part 1: Titles, Bob's intro, clips street traders, call of the beast, EOP.
Part 2: Bop Bob's intro, clips, call of the beast and animal practice, cedits, sketch and logo.

Credits 
Host - Bob Mills
Director - Tony Gregory
Producers - Jeff Pope, Beverley Taylor
Production Assts. - Amanda Church, S Scott
Researchers - Dan Clapton, Conrad Green, Tim Quicke
Film Researcher - Nick Ray
Production Manager - Jackie Penn
Vision Controller - Luke Chantrell
On-Line Editors - Danny Davies, Malcolm Dunnett, Mark Goodwin, Alex Maddison
Sound Supervisor - Charles Fearnley
Lighting Director - Warwick Fielding
Lighting Camera Persons - Ian Goff, Alun Knott
Floor Manager - Ken Hounsom
Designer - Margaret Howat
Vision Mixer - Alison Jones
Camera Person - Mike Patterson

Programme ten 
 Production code: 9C25406
 First aired: 1997-05-02
 Running time: 24:46

Summary 
Part 1: titles, intro, clips: vet, policeman, EOP.
Part 2: Bop, sketch Casualty Man, clips: Ghost File (with Billy Roberts) end credits, sketch and logo.

Credits 
Host - Bob Mills
Director - Tony Gregory
Producers - Jeff Pope, Beverley Taylor
Production Assts. - Amanda Church, S Scott
Researchers - Dan Clapton, Conrad Green, Tim Quicke
Film Researcher - Nick Ray
Production Manager - Jackie Penn
Vision Controller - Luke Chantrell
On-Line Editors - Danny Davies, Malcolm Dunnett, Mark Goodwin, Alex Maddison
Sound Supervisor - Charles Fearnley
Lighting Director - Warwick Fielding
Lighting Camera Persons - Ian Goff, Alun Knott
Floor Manager - Ken Hounsom
Designer - Margaret Howat
Vision Mixer - Alison Jones
Camera Person - Mike Patterson

Programme eleven 
 Production code: 9C25416
 First aired: 1997-05-09
 Running time: 24:32

Summary 
Full of third-party footage

Credits 
Host - Bob Mills
Director - Tony Gregory
Producers - Jeff Pope, Beverley Taylor
Production Assts. - Amanda Church, S Scott
Researchers - Dan Clapton, Conrad Green, Tim Quicke
Film Researcher - Nick Ray
Production Manager - Jackie Penn
Vision Controller - Luke Chantrell
On-Line Editors - Danny Davies, Malcolm Dunnett, Mark Goodwin, Alex Maddison
Sound Supervisor - Charles Fearnley
Lighting Director - Warwick Fielding
Lighting Camera Persons - Ian Goff, Alun Knott
Floor Manager - Ken Hounsom
Designer - Margaret Howat
Vision Mixer - Alison Jones
Camera Person - Mike Patterson

Programme twelve 
 Production code: 9C25417
 First aired: 1997-05-16
 Running time: 24:16

Summary 
Full of third-party footage

Credits 
Host - Bob Mills
Director - Tony Gregory
Producers - Jeff Pope, Beverley Taylor
Production Assts. - Amanda Church, S Scott
Researchers - Dan Clapton, Conrad Green, Tim Quicke
Film Researcher - Nick Ray
Production Manager - Jackie Penn
Vision Controller - Luke Chantrell
On-Line Editors - Danny Davies, Malcolm Dunnett, Mark Goodwin, Alex Maddison
Sound Supervisor - Charles Fearnley
Lighting Director - Warwick Fielding
Lighting Camera Persons - Ian Goff, Alun Knott
Floor Manager - Ken Hounsom
Designer - Margaret Howat
Vision Mixer - Alison Jones
Camera Person - Mike Patterson

Programme thirteen 
 Production code: 9C25418
 First aired: 1997-05-23
 Running time: 24:24

Summary 
Full of third-party footage

Credits 
Host - Bob Mills
Director - Tony Gregory
Producers - Jeff Pope, Beverley Taylor
Production Assts. - Amanda Church, S Scott
Researchers - Dan Clapton, Conrad Green, Tim Quicke
Film Researcher - Nick Ray
Production Manager - Jackie Penn
Vision Controller - Luke Chantrell
On-Line Editors - Danny Davies, Malcolm Dunnett, Mark Goodwin, Alex Maddison
Sound Supervisor - Charles Fearnley
Lighting Director - Warwick Fielding
Lighting Camera Persons - Ian Goff, Alun Knott
Floor Manager - Ken Hounsom
Designer - Margaret Howat
Vision Mixer - Alison Jones
Camera Person - Mike Patterson

Programme fourteen 
 Production code: 9C25415
 First aired: 1997-05-30
 Running time: 24:38

Summary 
Full of third-party footage

Credits 
Host - Bob Mills
Director - Tony Gregory
Producers - Jeff Pope, Beverley Taylor
Production Assts. - Amanda Church, S Scott
Researchers - Dan Clapton, Conrad Green, Tim Quicke
Film Researcher - Nick Ray
Production Manager - Jackie Penn
Vision Controller - Luke Chantrell
On-Line Editors - Danny Davies, Malcolm Dunnett, Mark Goodwin, Alex Maddison
Sound Supervisor - Charles Fearnley
Lighting Director - Warwick Fielding
Lighting Camera Persons - Ian Goff, Alun Knott
Floor Manager - Ken Hounsom
Designer - Margaret Howat
Vision Mixer - Alison Jones
Camera Person - Mike Patterson

Programme fifteen 
 Production code: 9C25420
 First aired: 1997-06-06
 Running time: 24:10

Summary 
Full of third-party footage

Credits 
Host - Bob Mills
Director - Tony Gregory
Producers - Jeff Pope, Beverley Taylor
Production Assts. - Amanda Church, S Scott
Researchers - Dan Clapton, Conrad Green, Tim Quicke
Film Researcher - Nick Ray
Production Manager - Jackie Penn
Vision Controller - Luke Chantrell
On-Line Editors - Danny Davies, Malcolm Dunnett, Mark Goodwin, Alex Maddison
Sound Supervisor - Charles Fearnley
Lighting Director - Warwick Fielding
Lighting Camera Persons - Ian Goff, Alun Knott
Floor Manager - Ken Hounsom
Designer - Margaret Howat
Vision Mixer - Alison Jones
Camera Person - Mike Patterson

Programme sixteen 
 Production code: 9C25419
 First aired: 1997-07-26
 Running time: 23:41

Summary 
Clips: Police - dodgy driver - breath test, Miss TV Times

Credits 
Host - Bob Mills
Director - Tony Gregory
Producers - Jeff Pope, Beverley Taylor
Production Assts. - Amanda Church, S Scott
Researchers - Dan Clapton, Conrad Green, Tim Quicke
Film Researcher - Nick Ray
Production Manager - Jackie Penn
Vision Controller - Luke Chantrell
On-Line Editors - Danny Davies, Malcolm Dunnett, Mark Goodwin, Alex Maddison
Sound Supervisor - Charles Fearnley
Lighting Director - Warwick Fielding
Lighting Camera Persons - Ian Goff, Alun Knott
Floor Manager - Ken Hounsom
Designer - Margaret Howat
Vision Mixer - Alison Jones
Camera Person - Mike Patterson

Programme seventeen 
 Production code: 9C25429
 First aired: 1997-05-02
 Running time: 24:15

Summary 
Full of third-party material

Credits 
Host - Bob Mills
Director - Tony Gregory
Producers - Jeff Pope, Beverley Taylor
Production Assts. - Amanda Church, S Scott
Researchers - Dan Clapton, Conrad Green, Tim Quicke
Film Researcher - Nick Ray
Production Manager - Jackie Penn
Vision Controller - Luke Chantrell
On-Line Editors - Danny Davies, Malcolm Dunnett, Mark Goodwin, Alex Maddison
Sound Supervisor - Charles Fearnley
Lighting Director - Warwick Fielding
Lighting Camera Persons - Ian Goff, Alun Knott
Floor Manager - Ken Hounsom
Designer - Margaret Howat
Vision Mixer - Alison Jones
Camera Person - Mike Patterson

Programme eighteen 
 Production code: 9C25430
 First aired: 1997-05-08
 Running time: 24:21

Summary 
Full of third-party material

Credits 
Host - Bob Mills
Director - Tony Gregory
Producers - Jeff Pope, Beverley Taylor
Production Assts. - Amanda Church, S Scott
Researchers - Dan Clapton, Conrad Green, Tim Quicke
Film Researcher - Nick Ray
Production Manager - Jackie Penn
Vision Controller - Luke Chantrell
On-Line Editors - Danny Davies, Malcolm Dunnett, Mark Goodwin, Alex Maddison
Sound Supervisor - Charles Fearnley
Lighting Director - Warwick Fielding
Lighting Camera Persons - Ian Goff, Alun Knott
Floor Manager - Ken Hounsom
Designer - Margaret Howat
Vision Mixer - Alison Jones
Camera Person - Mike Patterson

Programme nineteen 
 Production code: 9C25423
 First aired: 1997-08-23
 Running time: 24:30

Summary 
Full of third-party material

Credits 
Host - Bob Mills
Director - Tony Gregory
Producers - Jeff Pope, Beverley Taylor
Production Assts. - Amanda Church, S Scott
Researchers - Dan Clapton, Conrad Green, Tim Quicke
Film Researcher - Nick Ray
Production Manager - Jackie Penn
Vision Controller - Luke Chantrell
On-Line Editors - Danny Davies, Malcolm Dunnett, Mark Goodwin, Alex Maddison
Sound Supervisor - Charles Fearnley
Lighting Director - Warwick Fielding
Lighting Camera Persons - Ian Goff, Alun Knott
Floor Manager - Ken Hounsom
Designer - Margaret Howat
Vision Mixer - Alison Jones
Camera Person - Mike Patterson

Programme twenty 
 Production code: 9C25427
 First aired: 1997-05-22
 Running time: 24:30

Summary 
Full of third-party material

Credits 
Host - Bob Mills
Director - Tony Gregory
Producers - Jeff Pope, Beverley Taylor
Production Assts. - Amanda Church, S Scott
Researchers - Dan Clapton, Conrad Green, Tim Quicke
Film Researcher - Nick Ray
Production Manager - Jackie Penn
Vision Controller - Luke Chantrell
On-Line Editors - Danny Davies, Malcolm Dunnett, Mark Goodwin, Alex Maddison
Sound Supervisor - Charles Fearnley
Lighting Director - Warwick Fielding
Lighting Camera Persons - Ian Goff, Alun Knott
Floor Manager - Ken Hounsom
Designer - Margaret Howat
Vision Mixer - Alison Jones
Camera Person - Mike Patterson

Programme twenty-one 
 Production code: 9C25424
 First aired: 1997-05-29
 Running time: 24:45

Summary 
Full of third-party material

Credits 
Host - Bob Mills
Director - Tony Gregory
Producers - Jeff Pope, Beverley Taylor
Production Assts. - Amanda Church, S Scott
Researchers - Dan Clapton, Conrad Green, Tim Quicke
Film Researcher - Nick Ray
Production Manager - Jackie Penn
Vision Controller - Luke Chantrell
On-Line Editors - Danny Davies, Malcolm Dunnett, Mark Goodwin, Alex Maddison
Sound Supervisor - Charles Fearnley
Lighting Director - Warwick Fielding
Lighting Camera Persons - Ian Goff, Alun Knott
Floor Manager - Ken Hounsom
Designer - Margaret Howat
Vision Mixer - Alison Jones
Camera Person - Mike Patterson

Programme twenty-two 
 Production code: 9C25421
 First aired: 1997-06-05
 Running time: 24:23

Summary 
Full of third-party material

Credits 
Host - Bob Mills
Director - Tony Gregory
Producers - Jeff Pope, Beverley Taylor
Production Assts. - Amanda Church, S Scott
Researchers - Dan Clapton, Conrad Green, Tim Quicke
Film Researcher - Nick Ray
Production Manager - Jackie Penn
Vision Controller - Luke Chantrell
On-Line Editors - Danny Davies, Malcolm Dunnett, Mark Goodwin, Alex Maddison
Sound Supervisor - Charles Fearnley
Lighting Director - Warwick Fielding
Lighting Camera Persons - Ian Goff, Alun Knott
Floor Manager - Ken Hounsom
Designer - Margaret Howat
Vision Mixer - Alison Jones
Camera Person - Mike Patterson

Programme twenty-three 
 Production code: 9C25426
 First aired: 1997-06-12
 Running time: 24:27

Summary 
Full of third-party material

Credits 
Host - Bob Mills
Director - Tony Gregory
Producers - Jeff Pope, Beverley Taylor
Production Assts. - Amanda Church, S Scott
Researchers - Dan Clapton, Conrad Green, Tim Quicke
Film Researcher - Nick Ray
Production Manager - Jackie Penn
Vision Controller - Luke Chantrell
On-Line Editors - Danny Davies, Malcolm Dunnett, Mark Goodwin, Alex Maddison
Sound Supervisor - Charles Fearnley
Lighting Director - Warwick Fielding
Lighting Camera Persons - Ian Goff, Alun Knott
Floor Manager - Ken Hounsom
Designer - Margaret Howat
Vision Mixer - Alison Jones
Camera Person - Mike Patterson

Programme twenty-four 
 Production code: 9C25425
 First aired: 1997-06-19
 Running time: 24:35

Summary 
Full of third-party material

Credits 
Host - Bob Mills
Director - Tony Gregory
Producers - Jeff Pope, Beverley Taylor
Production Assts. - Amanda Church, S Scott
Researchers - Dan Clapton, Conrad Green, Tim Quicke
Film Researcher - Nick Ray
Production Manager - Jackie Penn
Vision Controller - Luke Chantrell
On-Line Editors - Danny Davies, Malcolm Dunnett, Mark Goodwin, Alex Maddison
Sound Supervisor - Charles Fearnley
Lighting Director - Warwick Fielding
Lighting Camera Persons - Ian Goff, Alun Knott
Floor Manager - Ken Hounsom
Designer - Margaret Howat
Vision Mixer - Alison Jones
Camera Person - Mike Patterson

Programme twenty-five 
 Production code: 9C25428
 First aired: 1997-06-26
 Running time: 24:13

Summary 
Full of third-party material

Credits 
Host - Bob Mills
Director - Tony Gregory
Producers - Jeff Pope, Beverley Taylor
Production Assts. - Amanda Church, S Scott
Researchers - Dan Clapton, Conrad Green, Tim Quicke
Film Researcher - Nick Ray
Production Manager - Jackie Penn
Vision Controller - Luke Chantrell
On-Line Editors - Danny Davies, Malcolm Dunnett, Mark Goodwin, Alex Maddison
Sound Supervisor - Charles Fearnley
Lighting Director - Warwick Fielding
Lighting Camera Persons - Ian Goff, Alun Knott
Floor Manager - Ken Hounsom
Designer - Margaret Howat
Vision Mixer - Alison Jones
Camera Person - Mike Patterson

Programme twenty-six 
 Production code: 9C25422
 First aired: 1997-07-03
 Running time: 24:35

Summary 
Full of third-party material

Credits 
Host - Bob Mills
Director - Tony Gregory
Producers - Jeff Pope, Beverley Taylor
Production Assts. - Amanda Church, S Scott
Researchers - Dan Clapton, Conrad Green, Tim Quicke
Film Researcher - Nick Ray
Production Manager - Jackie Penn
Vision Controller - Luke Chantrell
On-Line Editors - Danny Davies, Malcolm Dunnett, Mark Goodwin, Alex Maddison
Sound Supervisor - Charles Fearnley
Lighting Director - Warwick Fielding
Lighting Camera Persons - Ian Goff, Alun Knott
Floor Manager - Ken Hounsom
Designer - Margaret Howat
Vision Mixer - Alison Jones
Camera Person - Mike Patterson

1997 British television seasons